The  or simply Shin-Meishin for short is an expressway, linking Mie prefecture to Hyōgo Prefecture, which is partially open and partially under construction.  The expressways current length as of February 2008 is 49.7 km.  It connects to the Isewangan Expressway.

Interchanges, junctions, service areas and parking areas

IC: interchange
SIC: smart interchange
JCT: junction
SA: service area
PA: parking area
BS: bus stop
TN: tunnel

Main route

Kameyama connection route

Otsu connection route

See also
Central Nippon Expressway Company
West Nippon Expressway Company

References

Expressways in Japan
Roads in Hyōgo Prefecture
Roads in Kyoto Prefecture
Roads in Mie Prefecture
Roads in Osaka Prefecture
Roads in Shiga Prefecture